Elena Asachi, née Teyber, (30 October 1789 – May 1877) was a Romanian pianist, singer and composer of Austrian birth. She was the daughter of Austrian composer Anton Teyber and niece of concertmaster Franz Teyber.

Elena Teyber was born in Vienna and studied music under her father as a child in Dresden. Later she studied in Vienna under opera singer Domenico Donzelli. After completing her studies, she became a professor at Iaşi Conservatory where she was known as a pianist and composer from 1827 to 1863. She married Gheorghe Asachi, with whom she collaborated on songs and theatrical works. Together with her husband she promoted the creation of the first music institute in the Principality of Moldavia - the Philharmonic-Drama Conservatory. She died in Iaşi.

Works
Selected works include:
Fete pastoral des bergers moldaves (pastoral-vaudeville) 1834
Contrabantul (The Smuggler) (comedy-vaudeville) 1837
Tiganii (The Gypsies) (vaudeville with songs) 1856

Songs:
Ballade moldave (with G. Asachi) 1834
Se starb, sagst tu (G. Asachi, translated by E. Asachi) 1837
Song of Society (with G. Asachi) 1849

References 

1789 births
1877 deaths
19th-century Austrian people
19th-century classical composers
19th-century classical pianists
19th-century Romanian musicians
19th-century Romanian people
Austrian classical composers
Austrian classical pianists
Austrian women classical composers
Austrian women pianists
Musicians from Vienna
Romanian classical composers
Romanian classical pianists
Romanian people of Austrian descent
Women classical pianists
19th-century women composers
19th-century Romanian women
19th-century women pianists